Stéphane Buchou (born 14 March 1974) is a French politician of La République En Marche! (LREM) who has been serving as a member of the French National Assembly since the 2017 election, representing the department of Vendée.

Political career
In parliament, Buchou serves as member of the Committee on Sustainable Development and Spatial Planning. In addition, he is part of the French-Russian Parliamentary Friendship Group and the French delegation to the Inter-Parliamentary Union (IPU). In 2020, Buchou joined En commun (EC), a group within LREM led by Barbara Pompili.

Political positions
In May 2018, Buchou co-sponsored an initiative in favour of a bioethics law extending to homosexual and single women free access to fertility treatments such as in vitro fertilisation (IVF) under France's national health insurance; it was one of the campaign promises of President Emmanuel Macron and marked the first major social reform of his five-year term.

In July 2019, Buchou decided not to align with his parliamentary group's majority and became one of 52 LREM members who abstained from a vote on the French ratification of the European Union’s Comprehensive Economic and Trade Agreement (CETA) with Canada.

See also
 2017 French legislative election

References

Living people
Deputies of the 15th National Assembly of the French Fifth Republic
La République En Marche! politicians
Place of birth missing (living people)
1974 births
Deputies of the 16th National Assembly of the French Fifth Republic
Members of Parliament for Vendée